Gheybi may refer to:

Gheybi, Hormozgan
Gheybi, Lorestan